Hugo Stuven Cangas de Onís (2 November 1940 – 24 April 2021) was a Chilean-born Spanish TV producer for Televisión Española.

Biography and career
Hugo Stuven was born in Valparaíso, Chile on 2 November 1940 as the son of a banker and a judge. He arrived in Spain in 1965 after he asked a compatriot who worked in radio for a job, and, as he had worked in Spanish television, he opted for Televisión Española. He joined Televisión Española in 1966. He worked alongside  as a director.

He also made advertising spots, among them in 1982 for Freixenet with Norma Duval, Cheryl Ladd and Ann-Margret.

In the 1980s he directed Como Pedro por su casa (1985), with Pedro Ruiz, and the New Year's Eve Specials of 1987, "Súper 88" with Carmen Maura and Arturo Fernández, and 1988, with Martes y 13, Hola Hola 89.

In 1987 and 1988 he was appointed by Pilar Miró as head of the Design and Promotions Section of TVE, in which the promotion system and the headers of the programs were changed. He hired Nacho Cano for the music of some headers.

Subsequently, he was hired by private television channels, and made, among other programs, El Gordo, with Irma Soriano (Antena 3, 1993); Uno para todas (1995-1996), with Goyo González and Popstars (2002), with Jesús Vázquez. He was also in charge of the Miss Spain galas from 1998 to 2002 for Telecinco, the Gala de la Hispanidad for Telecinco from 1999 to 2001, the Gala de los Premios Amigo with Andreu Buenafuente for Telecinco (2000), the Gala de los Premios TP de Oro and many other live programs.

He also worked with Jesús Quintero in Ratones coloraos (2002-2004), on Canal Sur; El loco de la colina (2006), on TVE; and La noche de Quintero, on TVE (2007). In 2006 he published the autobiographical book Quién te ha visto y quién TVE. Historias de mi tele. Also during 2008 he produced and directed five documentary chapters for Canal Sur television under the title La guerra de la Independencia en Andalucía, on the occasion of the bicentenary of this event.

In July 2008, the  distinguished him with the award for Best Director for the program Ratones coloraos.

In 2009 he continued making the series Ratones coloraos de Jesús Quintero in its 9th season for Canal Sur, as well as the first season of Paz en la Tierra, presented by Paz Padilla, being replaced by Víctor Rivero in the second season. At the same time, the Channel commissioned him a documentary for Canal Sur 2, with recreations in Córdoba province of the Battle of Munda, which was the last battle of Julius Caesar before he was assassinated.

In 2010 he continued with the 9th season of Ratones coloraos as director and preparing new projects for various channels. He also directed the Gala Una Noche única de la ONCE on TVE on 11 November 2011. This is the case of Lolita with her brother Antonio both on the set of the Gala. He also conducted and directed a new Mister and Miss Spain gala from Seville through TDT Metropolitan TV and directed El Disco del Año in its eighth year broadcast in December by TVE.

In 2012, Hugo directed a gala broadcast by TVE where he brought together most of the Spanish humorists in a great tribute to the late comedian Miguel Gila. Sponsored by Campofrío after the spot directed by Álex de la Iglesia, Hugo together with Grupo Vértice took the helm of this special gala entitled Arriba ese Ánimo presented by Santiago Segura. He also directed another gala on 24 December 2012 titled Bailando y Cantando contigo for TVE where TVE presenters and singers such as Rosa López and Daniel Diges presented by comedian Carlos Latre participated.

In 2013 and 2014, he made two seasons of the program "Desexos Cumpridos" (Wishes Fulfilled) for TVG (Galician Autonomous Television).

Between 2014 and 2015, he directed, made and co-wrote three documentaries about olive oil El Oro de Andalucía (The Gold of Andalusia) investing a year in filming in Andalusia, and editing, following from the planting of the olive trees, through flowering, harvesting, oil mills, packaging until it is consumed that was broadcast on Canal Sur Televisión.

In the 2017–2018 academic year he began teaching Music Making (Theory and Practices) at the Official Institute of Spanish Radio Television where he continued as a teacher until his death.

Since 2018 he was part of the creative team of the NGO Voces as a volunteer. In 2020 he directed the documentary "La voz de la Cañada" about the illegal settlement of Cañada Real, for the NGO in co-production with TVE and SGAE and the collaboration of the TVE Institute and volunteer students.

Personal life and death
Hugo Stuven had ten children (one of them adopted), among them the film director, screenwriter and writer .

Stuven died on 24 April 2021, at the age of 80, from COVID-19 at Hospital Isabel Zendal in Madrid a few days after getting the Pfizer COVID-19 vaccine during the pandemic in Spain. He already had the virus before getting his vaccine, but this was not known at the time.

References

1940 births
2021 deaths
People from Valparaíso
Chilean emigrants to Spain
Spanish television directors
Deaths from the COVID-19 pandemic in Spain